Papa is a 2012 South Korean comedy-drama film written and directed by Han Ji-seung. Park Yong-woo stars as a talent manager who persuades his step-daughter from a contract marriage, played by Go Ara, to audition for a reality TV show in the United States.

Go Ara was nominated for Best New Actress at the 48th Baeksang Arts Awards, the 21st Buil Film Awards, and the 33rd Blue Dragon Film Awards in 2012.

Plot
Choon-sub (Park Yong-woo) is a talent manager from South Korea who flies to America to chase after his client who ran away with another manager. He soon learns that she is with child and would be unable to pursue her career. To avoid returning to Korea and face his boss, he gets a residency permit through a contract marriage with a Korean-American woman. When his wife dies in a car accident, he is left with her 6 children, all of different races, from her previous marriages. He discovers that the eldest daughter, June (Go Ara), is a talented singer and dancer. Now in need of money, he convinces her to take part in a reality TV show contest. Because the children need Choon-sub to keep the family together and not be relocated to different homes, June agrees.

Cast

Park Yong-woo as Choon-sub
Go Ara as June
Son Byong-ho as Company president Do
Michael Anthony McMillan as Gordon
Meg DeLacy as Maya
Parker Townsend as Jimmy
Peyton Townsend as Tammy
Angela Azar as Rosie
Yoon Seung-hoon as Yang-moo
Matthew Eldridge
Sharyn Shields as Phoebe, of the Children's Bureau
Jeremiah Hobbs as Phoebe's subordinate
Leland L. Jones as Immigration agent
Albert Lee as Immigration agent 
Jae Park Shawl as Mr. Do's subordinate 1 
Yeon Seung-joo as Mr. Do's subordinate 2 
Chase Steven Anderson as Audition coordinator
Justene Alpert as Rosie, 10 years later
Lee Gyu-seop as Waiter 1 
Paul Stafford as Auditioner
Michael Beasley as Coordinator
Holly Britt as Talent judge
Sherrie Billings as Nurse
Montrel Miller as Soldier #2
Seo Tae-hwa as Department head Seo (cameo)
Shim Hye-jin as Mi-young (cameo)
Daniel Henney as Daniel, music producer (cameo)
Park Sang-cheol as himself (cameo)
Jiyul as Mila (cameo)
Julian Quintart (cameo)

References

External links
 
 
 

2012 films
South Korean comedy-drama films
Films set in Atlanta
Films set in Seoul
Films shot in Seoul
Films shot in Atlanta
2010s South Korean films